The Cambridge by-election of 2 December 1976 was held after Conservative Member of Parliament (MP) David Lane resigned his seat to take up the position of Chairman of the Commission for Racial Equality. The seat was retained by the Tories in a result that cut the government majority to one seat.

Candidates
 Michael O'Loughlin had been the Liberal candidate for the same seat in the general elections of 1964, 1966, February 1974 and October 1974. He had not contested the seat at either the 1967 Cambridge by-election, or the 1970 general election. This was his fifth and last candidature for the seat.
 Robert Rhodes James was a noted historian and a former winner of the John Llewellyn Rhys Prize.
 Philip Sargent stood under the title "Science Fiction Looney" in what was probably the first use of the word 'looney' by a prospective Parliamentary candidate, in a move which in part inspired the naming of the Official Monster Raving Loony Party. There was a serious motive behind this apparently frivolous candidature, since it enabled the circulation of election literature opposing the National Front candidate. However, the principal ambition, for which the Party's supporters were willing to finance a parliamentary deposit, was to enter the Guinness Book of Records by polling the lowest number of votes recorded in a parliamentary election.  This was such an entertaining idea that over 300 students, confused during the pre-Vacation festivities into thinking they were being supportive, voted in favour of the Party, thus thwarting the ambition, but at a level where the deposit was simultaneously lost. 
 Jeremy Wotherspoon was an estate agent and former shop steward for the Transport and General Workers' Union. He had contested Watford for the National Front in the two general elections of 1974. He was a candidate for the British National Party in the 2009 European election in the South West England constituency.

Result of the by-election

The results of the by-election were as follows:

Result of the previous general election
Results from the previous general election were:

References

1976 elections in the United Kingdom
1976 in England
December 1976 events in the United Kingdom
By-election, 1976
By-election, 1976
By-elections to the Parliament of the United Kingdom in Cambridgeshire constituencies
20th century in Cambridge